Jane Prowse writes and directs theatre and television.

Her play, A Round-Heeled Woman, is a stage adaptation of Jane Juska's book A Round-Heeled Woman:  My Late-Life Adventures in Sex and Romance.  The play starred multi-award winning actress Sharon Gless and opened in San Francisco in January 2010; a new production, with Prowse directing ran at  the GableStage Theatre in Coral Gables, Florida, starting 30 December 2010.  The run was extended to 6 February 2011.  A London production took place from 18 October - 20 November at Riverside Studios, also starring Gless and directed by Prowse and transferred to the Aldwych Theatre, where it closed on 14 January 2012.

Also for theatre, Prowse co-wrote and directed Up On The Roof, which received three Olivier Award nominations, including Best Musical. She also directed productions of the musical at the Alliance Theatre in Atlanta and the Long Wharf Theatre in Connecticut. Prowse wrote and directed an adaptation of John Steinbeck's The Pearl, which won her the Royal Shakespeare Company's Buzz Goodbody ‘Best Director’ Award. Other theatre includes Anthony Minghella's A Little Like Drowning, The Amazing Dancing Bear and Overboard.

Prowse co-wrote the screenplay for Up On The Roof, which was subsequently made into a movie.

Recent television credits include working for Lynda La Plante, writing "Ghost Train" and "Witness" for Trial & Retribution, and "Boxers" for The Commander, which Prowse also directed. Other TV credits include The Green-Eyed Monster, The Fugitives, Between the Sheets, Rocket Man, Head Over Heels, The Tenth Kingdom, Living It, Sunny’s Ears and The Greatest Store in the World.

Prowse's first novel, Hattori Hachi: The Revenge of Praying Mantis, was published in 2009. Her second, Hattori Hachi:  Stalking the Enemy was published in June 2010 and the third in the series, Hattori Hachi:  Curse of the Diamond Daggers,  is due to be published early in 2012.

In 2010 she wrote the script for the feature film  Maya Fox, adapted from the books by Iginio Straffi and Silvia Brena.

References

External sources
 
 A Round-Heeled Woman : the play The official site
 Hattori Hachi

Year of birth missing (living people)
Living people
British dramatists and playwrights
British screenwriters
British theatre directors